Namatius was an early bishop of Clermont now recognised as a saint by Roman Catholics.

Namatius may also refer to:
Namatius (bishop of Vienne), died 559
Namatius (bishop of Orléans), died 587